University Park, also referred to as Penn State University Park, is the name given to the Pennsylvania State University's main campus located in both State College and College Township, Pennsylvania. The campus post office was designated "University Park, Pennsylvania" in 1953 by Penn State president Milton Eisenhower, after what was then Pennsylvania State College was upgraded to university status.

History

The school that later became Penn State University was founded as a degree-granting institution on February 22, 1855, by act P.L. 46, No. 50 of the General Assembly of the Commonwealth of Pennsylvania as the Farmers' High School of Pennsylvania. Centre County, Pennsylvania, became the home of the new school when James Irvin of Bellefonte, Pennsylvania, donated  of landthe first of  the school would eventually acquire. In 1862, the school's name was changed to the Agricultural College of Pennsylvania, and with the passage of the Morrill Land-Grant Acts, Pennsylvania selected the school in 1863 to be the state's sole land-grant college. The school's name changed to the Pennsylvania State College in 1874; enrollment fell to 64 undergraduates the following year as the school tried to balance purely agricultural studies with a more classic education.

In 1953, the university sought a name change for the town called State College to reflect the new status of the school as a university.  As the name change referendum failed to pass, the resolution ended with a new postal address to be called "University Park".

Student-run media
Media originating from University Park include Onward State; the world's most-read student-run news website, WKPS, a student run radio station; and The Daily Collegian, a student run newspaper.

Student government

Within the campus, a student government is a set of elected positions by the student body to represent the students with relations with the university. It is divided between undergraduate and graduate students.

Special interest groups representing minorities also exist within the campus also have an influence towards university policies that get enacted by the university.

Major buildings

Residence Commons
The residence commons are common areas for each of the residence hall areas.  Each one has a dining hall and a computer lab.  At one point in time, each had a radio station.  WEHR (East Halls Radio), which operated in Johnston Commons until 2005, was the last to survive.

 Waring Commons (West Halls)
 Warnock Commons (North Halls)
 Redifer Commons (South Halls)
 Findlay/Johnston Commons (East Halls)
 Pollock Commons (Pollock Halls)

Other resource areas
 Nittany Community Center (Nittany)

Houses a TV lounge, laundry facilities, Commons Desk, Residence Life/Housing Office for residents of Nittany Apartments and Suites.
 Weston Community Center (White Course)

Houses a TV lounge, Commons Desk, Residence Life/Housing Office for residents of White Course Apartments.
 Brill Hall (Eastview Terrace)

Houses a TV lounge, Front Desk, Residence Life/Housing Office for residents of Eastview Terrace.

East Halls
East Halls is the largest group of residence halls on campus, and is served by Findlay/Johnston Commons.  It is reserved primarily for first-year student housing, and most residents share a double room with a roommate. The area's special living options are First-Year Interest in Liberal Arts and Education and Tri-Service ROTC. All of the buildings in the East Halls residence area are named after former governors of Pennsylvania. All of the halls and commons within East Halls are connected via an underground maintenance tunnel system (entrance doors locked). The residence halls are:

Bigler
Brumbaugh
Curtin
Earle
Fisher
Geary
Hastings
Martin
McKean
Packer
Pennypacker
Pinchot
Snyder
Sproul
Stone
Stuart
Tener

North Halls
North Halls is the smallest residence hall complex at the University Park campus, consisting of five residence halls. They are known as the most comfortable on campus, with all rooms being carpeted and having their own bathroom. Nearly all rooms in North residence halls are suites for two or four students, however there are a few rooms for only a single resident.  The two- and four-person suites are made up of four rooms with two bedrooms with a shared living room separating them, and the bathroom connected to the shared living room.

Leete was the first hall converted to this format.  North Halls special living options are Arts and Architecture (A&A), Business and Society House (BASH), and EARTH House.

Robinson (as of Fall 2017)
Holmes
Leete
Runkle
Beam
This building was once converted to offices for the Business Administration department, and more recently the Dickinson School of Law. The structure of Beam is identical to the other North Halls residence halls. It was reopened as of the Fall 2009 semester.

Pollock Halls
Pollock Halls is the third-largest residence hall complex on campus, consisting of co-ed and female only residence halls.  Most rooms are shared by two students.  Pollock Halls houses nine special livings options: Be House (Be-Engaged as of August 2013), Discover House, EASI (Engineering and Applied Sciences), Forensic Science Interest House, HEAL (Health Education and Awareness in Living), HAC (Helping Across the Community), ILH (International Languages), LIFE (Living in a Free Environment as of August 2013), and WISE (Women in Science and Engineering).  Pollock Halls also contains housing for eleven sororities.

Beaver – Co-ed Hall with several Special Living Options
Hartranft – Co-ed First Year Hall
Hiester – Co-ed Upperclassman Hall with Alpha Omicron Pi, Phi Mu, and Pi Beta Phi Sororities
Mifflin – Co-ed First Year Hall
Porter – Co-ed First Year Hall
Ritner – Female Hall with Sigma Kappa, and Zeta Tau Alpha Sororities
Shulze – Co-Ed Upperclassman Hall with Sigma Delta Tau, and Delta Gamma Sororities
Shunk – Co-ed First Year Hall
Wolf – Female Upperclassman Hall with Kappa Alpha Theta, Alpha Xi Delta, and Alpha Phi Sororities

South Halls and South Proper

South Halls offers housing for Schreyer Honors College students in Atherton and Simmons, and in addition offers male, female and co-ed residence halls. At one point both McElwain Hall and Simmons Hall both contained a dining complex, but as of May 2011 their dining areas were eliminated to increase residential room space. South Halls also contains housing for sororities. On a Residence Life basis, McElwain has been moved to the Pollock Residential Life area.

Atherton (newly remodeled restrooms as of August 2013, adopting a "wet core" restroom concept).
Simmons
McElwain
Eastview Terrace (for more information on Eastview Terrace, scroll down)
Nittany Apartments (for more information on Nittany Apartments, scroll down)

South Proper
Chace (is a brand new residence hall facility with A/C and kitchenette and opened its doors in August 2013.  Also includes a "wet core" restroom concept)
These two buildings are connected to each other:
Haller (newly remodeled with A/C and kitchenettes as of August 2013.  Also includes a "wet core" restroom concept)
Lyons (newly remodeled with A/C and kitchenettes as of August 2013.  Also includes a "wet core" restroom concept)

These two buildings are connected to each other:
Cross (newly remodeled with A/C and kitchenettes as of January 2014. Also includes a "wet core" restroom concept)
Ewing (newly remodeled with A/C and kitchenettes as of January 2014. Also includes a "wet core" restroom concept)

These two buildings are connected to each other:
Cooper (will be newly remodeled with A/C and kitchenettes as of August 2014. Will include a "wet core" restroom concept)
Hoyt (will be newly remodeled with A/C and kitchenettes as of August 2014.  Will include a "wet core" restroom concept)

These two buildings are connected to each other:
Stephens (will be newly remodeled with A/C and kitchenettes as of January 2015. Will include a "wet core" restroom concept)
Hibbs with Alpha Delta Pi and Alpha Chi Omega Sororities (will be newly remodeled with A/C and kitchenettes as of January 2015. Will include a "wet core" restroom concept)

*A Wet Core restroom concept eliminates the need to have "gender specific" restrooms in that there is a common sink space that everyone shares with every toilet/shower in a separate room behind a locked door.  The wet core concept eliminates the traditional restroom design and allows for more privacy for any student without having to worry about gender obstacles.

Nittany Apartments and Suites
Nittany Apartments and Suites provide the luxury of apartment and suite living while allowing students to still live on campus. Nittany Apartments houses same-sex students in either two-bedroom or four-bedroom apartments, complete with bathroom, living room, and kitchen. Nittany Suites—made up exclusively of Nittany Hall—houses single upperclass students in two-bedroom suites. Four people live in each suite. These living areas are available to upperclass students.

Eastview Terrace
Eastview Terrace is a residence location specifically for sophomores, juniors, and seniors. It houses 806 undergraduates, providing a private bedroom and bath for each student. Its location, east of South Halls, is perfect for an atmosphere that feels as though it off campus while remaining on campus. Additional charges do apply to Eastview Terrace rooms.

Brill
Curry
Harris
Miller
Nelson
Panofsky
Young

West Halls
West Halls offers male, female, and co-ed housing in single, regular double, small double, and triple rooms. West Halls also includes the oldest residence halls on campus that are still in use. Several special living options are offered in West Halls, including EMS (Earth and Mineral Sciences), IST Interest House, (LGBT) Ally House, and E-House (Engineering House).

Hamilton
Irvin (EMS)( and once was home to the Penn State football players)
Jordan
McKee (E-House)
Thompson (IST Interest House)
Watts (renovated, Ally House)

White Course Apartments
This living area has previously only been available to full-time graduate students.  As of Fall 2008 the area is open to undergraduates. The area provides housing for single graduate students, as well as graduate students in relationships and with families. The area provides one-, two-, and three-bedroom apartments, as well as townhouses.

Bernreuter
Cunningham
Donkin
Dunham
Farrell
Ferguson
Garban
Grubb
Haffner
Holderman
Ikenberry
Lovejoy
Osborn
Palladino
Patterson
Ray

Major landmarks
 Beaver Stadium – the second largest stadium in the western hemisphere and home of Penn State Football
 Bryce Jordan Center – home of Men's and Women's Penn State Basketball as well as other indoor sports and entertainment events
 Eisenhower Auditorium – home to a variety of academic, business, and entertainment events
 HUB–Robeson Center – commonly referred to as "The Hub"
 Jeffrey Field – home of the Men's and Women's Penn State Soccer and Lacrosse teams
 McCoy Natatorium – home of the Men's and Women's Penn State Varsity Swim teams Recreation Facilities
 Medlar Field at Lubrano Park – home of the State College Spikes and Penn State Men's Baseball teams
 Nittany Lion Shrine – second most photographed location in Pennsylvania
 Old Main – Penn State's first building of major significance, completed in 1863
 The Palmer Museum of Art – prominent visual arts facility and cultural resource for Penn State and local community
 Pavilion Theatre – intimate 300-seat flexible arena/thrust performance space
 Pegula Ice Arena – home of the Men's and Women's Penn State Varsity Hockey teams
 Penn State All-Sports Museum – honors all Penn State Nittany Lion athletes
 Penn State Creamery – the largest university creamery in the world
 Penn State Ice Pavilion – former home of the Men's and Women's Penn State Varsity Hockey teams
 Playhouse Theatre – home of Penn State's University Resident Theatre Company (URTC)
 Rec Hall – a field house that is home of the Men's and Women's Penn State Gymnastics, Volleyball, and Wrestling
 Schwab Auditorium – home to a variety of academic, business, and entertainment events

Athletics

References

1953 establishments in Pennsylvania
 
Pennsylvania State University campuses
Populated places established in 1953
Unincorporated communities in Centre County, Pennsylvania
Unincorporated communities in Pennsylvania